, also known by her nickname  or Sugi Rock, is a Japanese female mixed martial arts (MMA) fighter. She has competed professionally since 2009. In 2011, she became the first Jewels featherweight champion. Besides Jewels, Sugiyama has also competed in MMA promotions Valkyrie and Invicta Fighting Championships.

Background

Mixed martial arts career
In her last fight with Valkyrie, in an upset, Sugiyama defeated the then-flyweight champion Yasuko Tamada via unanimous decision in a non-title bout at Valkyrie 8.

On , at Jewels 17th Ring, Sugiyama was crowned as the first Jewels Featherweight Queen after winning the Jewels Featherweight Queen GP by defeating Kikuyo Ishikawa via split decision and Misaki Takimoto via technical submission (armbar).

Despite being penalized for not making weight, Sugiyama was able to defeat Tamada once again by majority decision, keeping her unbeaten record intact.

Penne defeated Sugiyama by submission (triangle choke) in the second round.

On , Sugiyama faced Celine Haga in a non-title bout at Jewels 23rd Ring. She was defeated by unanimous decision.

She was defeated by unanimous decision.

On , Sugiyama faced Masako Yoshida at Deep Jewels 2. She won the fight by unanimous decision.

Championships and accomplishments

Mixed martial arts
Jewels
Featherweight Queen Grand Prix winner (2011)
Atomweight Championship (Two times; current)

Mixed martial arts record

|-
| Loss
|align=center| 12-5
| Mina Kurobe
| Decision (unanimous)
| Deep Jewels 15
| 
|align=center| 3
|align=center| 5:00
| Tokyo, Japan
| 
|-
| Win
|align=center| 12-4
| Emi Tomimatsu
| Decision (unanimous)
| Deep Jewels 12
| 
|align=center| 3
|align=center| 5:00
| Tokyo, Japan
| 
|-
| Win
|align=center| 11-4
| Mina Kurobe
| Decision (unanimous)
| Deep Jewels 10
| 
|align=center| 3
|align=center| 5:00
| Tokyo, Japan
|
|-
| Loss
|align=center| 10-4
| Ayaka Hamasaki
| TKO (Punches)
| Deep Jewels 5
| 
|align=center| 1
|align=center| 4:01
| Tokyo, Japan
|
|-
| Win
|align=center| 10-3
| Satomi Takano
| Decision (split)
| Deep Jewels 3
| 
|align=center| 2
|align=center| 5:00
| Tokyo, Japan
| 
|-
| Win
|align=center| 9-3
| Masako Yoshida
| Decision (unanimous)
| Deep Jewels 2
| 
|align=center| 2
|align=center| 5:00
| Tokyo, Japan
| 
|-
| Loss
|align=center| 8-3
| Seo Hee Ham
| Decision (unanimous)
| Jewels 24th Ring
| 
|align=center| 3
|align=center| 5:00
| Tokyo, Japan
| 
|-
| Loss
|align=center| 8-2
| Celine Haga
| Decision (unanimous)
| Jewels 23rd Ring
| 
|align=center| 2
|align=center| 5:00
| Tokyo, Japan
| 
|-
| Loss
|align=center| 8-1
| Jessica Penne
| Submission (triangle choke)
| Invicta FC 3: Penne vs. Sugiyama
| 
|align=center| 2
|align=center| 2:20
| Kansas City, Kansas, United States
| 
|-
| Win
|align=center| 8-0
| Yasuko Tamada
| Decision (majority)
| Jewels 19th Ring
| 
|align=center| 2
|align=center| 5:00
| Osaka, Japan
| 
|-
| Win
|align=center| 7-0
| Misaki Takimoto
| Technical Submission (armbar)
| Jewels 17th Ring
| 
|align=center| 1
|align=center| 4:09
| Tokyo, Japan
| 
|-
| Win
|align=center| 6-0
| Kikuyo Ishikawa
| Decision (split)
| Jewels 17th Ring
| 
|align=center| 2
|align=center| 5:00
| Tokyo, Japan
| 
|-
| Win
|align=center| 5-0
| Ayumi Saito
| Decision (unanimous)
| Jewels 16th Ring
| 
|align=center| 2
|align=center| 5:00
| Tokyo, Japan
| 
|-
| Win
|align=center| 4-0
| Misaki Takimoto
| Submission (rear-naked choke)
| Jewels 13th Ring & 14th Ring
| 
|align=center| 1
|align=center| 4:06
| Tokyo, Japan
| 
|-
| Win
|align=center| 3-0
| Yasuko Tamada
| Decision (unanimous)
| Valkyrie 8
| 
|align=center| 3
|align=center| 3:00
| Tokyo, Japan
| 
|-
| Win
|align=center| 2-0
| Megumi Morioka
| TKO (punches)
| Valkyrie 6
| 
|align=center| 2
|align=center| 2:20
| Tokyo, Japan
| 
|-
| Win
|align=center| 1-0
| Madoka Ebihara
| Decision (unanimous)
| Valkyrie 3
| 
|align=center| 3
|align=center| 3:00
| Tokyo, Japan
|

See also
List of female mixed martial artists

References

External links
Official blog 
 Naho Sugiyama Awakening Profile

Profile at Wajutsu Keishukai Akza website 

1978 births
Japanese female mixed martial artists
Living people
Sportspeople from Kyoto Prefecture
Atomweight mixed martial artists
Featherweight mixed martial artists